Trabzonspor in European football includes the games which are played by Trabzonspor in UEFA organizations.

Totals

Top scorers

Competitions Sorted by Countries

Most Played Teams

Results

(1976–1980)

(1981–1990)

(1991–2000)

1991-92 season

Trabzonspor won 4–3 on aggregate.

Trabzonspor won 8–4 on aggregate.

Boldklubben 1903 won 2–1 on aggregate.

1992-93 season

Trabzonspor won 2–1 on aggregate.

Atlético Madrid won 2–0 on aggregate.

1993-94 season

Trabzonspor won 6–2 on aggregate.

1994-95 season

Trabzonspor won 5–4 on aggregate.

SS Lazio won 4–2 on aggregate.

1995-96 season

Trabzonspor won 3–2 on aggregate.

Deportivo de La Coruña won 4–0 on aggregate.

1996-97 season

Trabzonspor won 5–3 on aggregate.

Trabzonspor won 5–2 on aggregate.

FC Schalke 04 won 4–3 on aggregate.

1997-98 season

Trabzonspor won 2–1 on aggregate.

VfL Bochum won 6–4 on aggregate.

1998-99 season

Wisła Kraków won 7–2 on aggregate.

1999-2000 season

Trabzonspor won 4–2 on aggregate.

Hamburger SV won 6–3 on aggregate.

(2001–2010)

2003–04 season

2004–05 season

2005–06 season

2006–07 season

2007–08 season

2009–10 season

2009–10 season

(2011–2020)

2011–12 season

2012–13 season

2013–14 season

2014–15 season

2015–16 season

2019–20 season

(2021–2030)

2021–22 season

2022–23 season

Notes

References

External links
 Trabzonspor in www.uefa.com
 Official web site of Trabzonspor

Trabzonspor
Trabzonspor